Somera Sól is the second album from the stoner rock band Brant Bjork and the Bros, and the seventh solo album from Brant Bjork. It features former Kyuss drummer Alfredo Hernandez and guest appearances by Sean Wheeler of Throw Rag and Mario Lalli of Fatso Jetson. The album was reissued by Brant Bjork's former record label Low Desert Punk in 2008 with altered artwork, and again in 2022 by Bjork's current record label Heavy Psych Sounds Records featuring new artwork.

Track listing

Personnel
The Bros

Brant Bjork – guitar, vocals
Dylan Roche – bass
Scott "Cortez" Silverman – guitar
Alfredo Hernández – drums, percussion

Additional Bros

Mario Lalli – vocals, guitar
Vince Meghrouni – saxophone, flute
Olive Lalli – vocals
Sean Wheeler – vocals

Credits
Recorded and mixed by Mathias Cornelius von Schneeberger at Donner and Blitzen Arcadia, California.
Mastered by Evren Gokner at Capitol.
Produced by Brant Bjork and Ryan Snyder for Duna Productions.
Duna art direction - Cale Bunker
Cover art - Bunker/Bjork

Notes
Besides the Sabbia soundtrack, the album contains the first studio recording of "Ultimate Kickback," a song which Brant has been performing live since 2004.

References

Brant Bjork albums
2007 albums